Adolphe Stoclet (30 September 1871 – 3 November 1949) was a Belgian engineer, financier and noted collector. Today, however, he is most famous as the man who commissioned the Stoclet Palace, a mansion in Brussels, Belgium, between 1907 and 1911.

Life
Stoclet was born into a family of Belgian bankers in Saint-Gilles, Belgium, on 30 September 1871. After studying civil engineering at the Free University of Brussels, he was employed by Italian and Austrian railway companies from 1894 onwards. He returned to Belgium in 1904 and began working for the Compagnie Internationale de Chemins de Fer, becoming chairman in 1927.

His wife, Suzanne, was a niece of the painter Alfred Stevens, and daughter of the art historian Alfred Stevens. They had two sons, René (b. 1902) and Jacques (b. 1903), and one daughter, Raymonde (b. 1897). Stoclet was described by contemporaries as charming, but somewhat pompous, and had a large beard said to resemble that of the Assyrian king Ashurbanipal.

After his father's death, Stoclet became one of the directors of the Société Générale de Belgique, which for many years was one of the largest holding companies in Belgium and owned about forty different enterprises, including banks, arms factories, and mines in the Belgian Congo. Banque d'Outremer, an affiliate of the Société Générale de Banque, had its office on the Rue Brederode/Brederodestraat. Stoclet had his own office there refurbished by the architect Josef Hoffmann, one of the masters of the Vienna Secession (and later, the Wiener Werkstätte).

Stoclet met Hoffman while in Vienna to oversee the construction of a railroad. Stoclet shared Hoffmann's avant-garde artistic inclinations, and commissioned the latter to build him his own villa. While Stoclet initially considered building the house in Vienna, eventually he settled on a site in Brussels. The architect received not only artistic license for the design, but also an unlimited budget. Hoffmann left much of the interior decoration for the Stoclet Palace to the painters Gustav Klimt and Fernand Khnopff. Madame Stoclet apparently coordinated the colors of the flowers in the vases with the ties Stoclet wore.

The Stoclet Palace is situated 279–281, Avenue de Tervueren/Tervurenlaan, in the Woluwe-Saint-Pierre municipality of Brussels. Stoclet resided there until his death on 3 November 1949. His wife died a fortnight later, and their art collection was divided between their three children. The Stoclet Palace is still occupied by their heirs.

References

1871 births
1949 deaths
Belgian civil engineers
19th-century Belgian engineers
20th-century Belgian engineers